Tiziano Galvanin (5 March 1941 – 7 January 2004) was an Italian racing cyclist. He rode in the 1962 Tour de France.

References

1941 births
2004 deaths
Italian male cyclists
Place of birth missing